Clarence Benjamin Wonnacott (31 December 1909 – 1989) was an English professional footballer who played in the Football League for Mansfield Town and Northampton Town.

References

1909 births
1989 deaths
English footballers
Association football forwards
English Football League players
Mansfield Town F.C. players
Northampton Town F.C. players
Shelbourne F.C. players
Kidderminster Harriers F.C. players